Faqa'a Al-Awadh is a sub-district located in Radman Al Awad District, Al Bayda Governorate, Yemen.  Faqa'a Al-Awadh had a population of 1444 according to the 2004 census.

References 

Sub-districts in Radman Al Awad District